Peazens and Moddergat are two adjacent villages in Noardeast-Fryslân in the province of Friesland, the Netherlands. They have a combined population of around 405 as of 2021. Officially both villages are separate, but they are twinned together with only a canal between them.

References 

Populated places in Friesland
Noardeast-Fryslân